CRE.EP is the second EP released by American band Fenix TX. It is their first EP released since changing the band's name to Fenix TX. It is the band's first studio release of since their album Lechuza. CRE.EP is the band's first release without longtime member Damon DeLaPaz. The first track, "Spooky Action at a Distance", first appeared on the soundtrack of MLB 13: The Show.

Track listing

Personnel
Fenix TX
 William Salazar – vocals, guitar
 Chris Lewis – guitar, backing vocals
 Adam Lewis – bass, backing vocals

Additional musicians
 Hayden Scott – drums

References

Fenix TX albums
2016 EPs